PLC Panoramais the third largest shopping center in Vilnius and the seventh largest shopping mall  in Lithuania with 65,000 m2 (700,000 sq ft). It is owned by UAB E.L.L. „Nekilnojamas Turtas“ (Group E.L.L. Real Estate). It was built by the Lithuanian company  in 2008 in Saltoniškės. There are 180 dealer locations, 18 cafes and restaurants, 1600 free parking spaces in the underground car park, 30 escalators and lifts.

See also 
 List of shopping malls in Lithuania

References

External links 

 

Shopping malls in Vilnius
Commercial buildings completed in 2008